Ana Rujas (born 1989) is a Spanish model turned actress.

Early life 
Born in 1989 in Madrid, she enrolled in a modeling agency at age 16.

Career 
Her first big role was in 90-60-90, diario secreto de una adolescente. She played the role of Shaila Dúrcal in the biopic of Rocío Dúrcal. In 2016, she starred in the music video of Zahara, "Caída Libre". She had endorsed the jewelry brand "Aristocrazy". She recently acted in a Play, ¿Qué sabes tú de mis tristezas? (What do you know about my sorrows?).

In 2022, she scooped the Feroz Award for Best Leading Actress in a TV Series for her performance in Cardo (co-created by Rujas alongside Claudia Costafreda), which also won the Best Drama Series Award.

References

External links 

1989 births
Living people
21st-century Spanish actresses
Spanish female models
Spanish television actresses
Spanish film actresses